Travis Credit Union Park, also known as Nut Tree Stadium, was a stadium in Vacaville, California.  It was primarily used for baseball and was the home field of the Solano Steelheads of the Western Baseball League and later the Solano Thunderbirds.  The ballpark had a capacity of 2,800 people.

In 2008, a deal was reached to tear down the ballpark and move it to Redding, California. Bleacher and bucket seats from Vacaville were added ro Redding's Tiger Field during the 2014 renovation that brought the ballpark's capacity to 1,200 seats.

References

Solano Thunderbirds
Colt .45s, Simpson University reach deal to bring Vacaville baseball stadium to Redding, Jeffrey Jen, Redding Record Searchlight, April 1, 2008

Baseball venues in California
Minor league baseball venues
Buildings and structures in Vacaville, California